Bangala Dam lies in south-eastern Zimbabwe, south of Masvingo.  It was built by Concor to provide irrigation water to the farming estates on the lowveld to the southwest, around the town of Triangle, where the main crop has been sugar cane.

The lake and environs are protected as Bangala Dam Recreational Park.

References

Masvingo
Buildings and structures in Masvingo Province
Dams in Zimbabwe
Dams completed in 1963